Columbia  is a city in the U.S. state of Missouri. It is the county seat of Boone County and home to the University of Missouri. Founded in 1821, it is the principal city of the five-county Columbia metropolitan area. It is Missouri's fourth most-populous and fastest growing city, with an estimated 126,254 residents in 2020.

As a Midwestern college town, Columbia has a reputation for progressive politics, persuasive journalism, and public art. The tripartite establishment of Stephens College (1833), the University of Missouri (1839), and Columbia College (1851), which surround the city's Downtown to the east, south, and north, has made the city a center of learning. At its center is 8th Street (also known as the Avenue of the Columns), which connects Francis Quadrangle and Jesse Hall to the Boone County Courthouse and the City Hall. Originally an agricultural town, education is now Columbia's primary economic concern, with secondary interests in the healthcare, insurance, and technology sectors; it has never been a manufacturing center. Companies like Shelter Insurance, Carfax, Veterans United Home Loans, and Slackers CDs and Games, were founded in the city. Cultural institutions include the State Historical Society of Missouri, the Museum of Art and Archaeology, and the annual True/False Film Festival and the Roots N Blues Festival. The Missouri Tigers, the state's only major college athletic program, play football at Faurot Field and basketball at Mizzou Arena as members of the rigorous Southeastern Conference.

The city rests upon the forested hills and rolling prairies of Mid-Missouri, near the Missouri River valley, where the Ozark Mountains begin to transform into plains and savanna. Limestone forms bluffs and glades while rain dissolves the bedrock, creating caves and springs which water the Hinkson, Roche Perche, and Bonne Femme creeks. Surrounding the city, Rock Bridge Memorial State Park, Mark Twain National Forest, and Big Muddy National Fish and Wildlife Refuge form a greenbelt preserving sensitive and rare environments. The Columbia Agriculture Park is home to the Columbia Farmers Market.

The first humans who entered the area at least 12,000 years ago were nomadic hunters. Later, woodland tribes lived in villages along waterways and built mounds in high places. The Osage and Missouria nations were expelled by the exploration of French traders and the rapid settlement of American pioneers. The latter arrived by the Boone's Lick Road and hailed from the culture of the Upland South, especially Virginia, Kentucky, and Tennessee. From 1812, the Boonslick area played a pivotal role in Missouri's early history and the nation's westward expansion. German, Irish, and other European immigrants soon joined. The modern populace is unusually diverse, over 8% foreign-born. White and black people are the largest ethnicities, and people of Asian descent are the third-largest group. The city has been called the "Athens of Missouri" for its classic beauty and educational emphasis, but is more commonly called "CoMo".

History

Columbia's origins begin with the settlement of American pioneers from Kentucky and Virginia in an early 1800s region known as the Boonslick. Before 1815 settlement in the region was confined to small log forts due to the threat of Native American attack during the War of 1812. When the war ended settlers came on foot, horseback, and wagon, often moving entire households along the Boone's Lick Road and sometimes bringing enslaved African Americans. By 1818 it was clear that the increased population would necessitate a new county be created from territorial Howard County. The Moniteau Creek on the west and Cedar Creek on the east were obvious natural boundaries.

In 1819 Smithton was a small cluster of log cabins in an ancient forest of oak and hickory; chief among them was the cabin of Richard Gentry, a trustee of the Smithton Company who would become first mayor of Columbia. In 1820, Boone County was formed and named after the recently deceased explorer Daniel Boone. The Missouri Legislature appointed John Gray, Jefferson Fulcher, Absalom Hicks, Lawrence Bass, and David Jackson as commissioners to select and establish a permanent county seat. Smithton never had more than twenty people, and it was quickly realized that well digging was difficult because of the bedrock.

Springs were discovered across the Flat Branch Creek, so in the spring of 1821 Columbia was laid out, and the inhabitants of Smithton moved their cabins to the new town. The first house in Columbia was built by Thomas Duly in 1820 at what became Fifth and Broadway. Columbia's permanence was ensured when it was chosen as county seat in 1821 and the Boone's Lick Road was rerouted down Broadway.

The roots of Columbia's three economic foundations—education, medicine, and insurance— can be traced to the city's incorporation in 1821. Original plans for the town set aside land for a state university. In 1833, Columbia Baptist Female College opened, which later became Stephens College. Columbia College, distinct from today's and later to become the University of Missouri, was founded in 1839. When the state legislature decided to establish a state university, Columbia raised three times as much money as any competing city, and James S. Rollins donated the land that is today the Francis Quadrangle. Soon other educational institutions were founded in Columbia, such as Christian Female College, the first college for women west of the Mississippi, which later became Columbia College.

The city benefited from being a stagecoach stop of the Santa Fe and Oregon trails, and later from the Missouri–Kansas–Texas Railroad. In 1822, William Jewell set up the first hospital. In 1830, the first newspaper began; in 1832, the first theater in the state was opened; and in 1835, the state's first agricultural fair was held. By 1839, the population of 13,000 and wealth of Boone County was exceeded in Missouri only by that of St. Louis County, which, at that time, included the City of St. Louis.

Columbia's infrastructure was relatively untouched by the Civil War. As a slave state, Missouri had many residents with Southern sympathies, but it stayed in the Union. The majority of the city was pro-Union; however, the surrounding agricultural areas of Boone County and the rest of central Missouri were decidedly pro-Confederate. Because of this, the University of Missouri became a base from which Union troops operated. No battles were fought within the city because the presence of Union troops dissuaded Confederate guerrillas from attacking, though several major battles occurred at nearby Boonville and Centralia.

After Reconstruction, race relations in Columbia followed the Southern pattern of increasing violence of whites against blacks in efforts to suppress voting and free movement: George Burke, a black man who worked at the university, was lynched in 1889. In the spring of 1923, James T. Scott, an African-American janitor at the University of Missouri, was arrested on allegations of raping a university professor's daughter. He was taken from the county jail and lynched on April 29 before a white mob of several hundred, hanged from the Old Stewart Road Bridge.

In the 21st century, a number of efforts have been undertaken to recognize Scott's death. In 2010 his death certificate was changed to reflect that he was never tried or convicted of charges, and that he had been lynched. In 2011 a headstone was put at his grave at Columbia Cemetery; it includes his wife's and parents' names and dates, to provide a fuller account of his life. In 2016, a marker was erected at the lynching site to memorialize Scott. In 1901, Rufus Logan established The Columbia Professional newspaper to serve Columbia's large African American population.

In 1963, University of Missouri System and the Columbia College system established their headquarters in Columbia. The insurance industry also became important to the local economy as several companies established headquarters in Columbia, including Shelter Insurance, Missouri Employers Mutual, and Columbia Insurance Group. State Farm Insurance has a regional office in Columbia. In addition, the now-defunct Silvey Insurance was a large local employer.

Columbia became a transportation crossroads when U.S. Route 63 and U.S. Route 40 (which was improved as present-day Interstate 70) were routed through the city. Soon after, the city opened the Columbia Regional Airport. By 2000, the city's population was nearly 85,000.

In 2017, Columbia was in the path of totality for the Solar eclipse of August 21, 2017. The city was expecting upwards of 400,000 tourists coming to view the eclipse.

Geography
The city is near the Missouri River, between the Ozark Plateau and the Northern Plains.

Topography
The city generally slopes from the highest point in the Northeast to the lowest point in the Southwest towards the Missouri River. Prominent tributaries of the river are Perche Creek, Hinkson Creek, and Flat Branch Creek. Along these and other creeks in the area can be found large valleys, cliffs, and cave systems such as that in Rock Bridge State Park just south of the city. These creeks are largely responsible for numerous stream valleys giving Columbia hilly terrain similar to the Ozarks while also having prairie flatland typical of northern Missouri. Columbia also operates several greenbelts with trails and parks throughout town.

Animal life
Large mammals found in the city include urbanized coyotes, red foxes, and numerous whitetail deer. Eastern gray squirrel, and other rodents are abundant, as well as cottontail rabbits and the nocturnal opossum and raccoon. Large bird species are abundant in parks and include the Canada goose, mallard duck, as well as shorebirds, including the great egret and great blue heron. Turkeys are also common in wooded areas and can occasionally be seen on the MKT recreation trail. Populations of bald eagles are found by the Missouri River. The city is on the Mississippi Flyway, used by migrating birds, and has a large variety of small bird species, common to the eastern U.S. The Eurasian tree sparrow, an introduced species, is limited in North America to the counties surrounding St. Louis. Columbia has large areas of forested and open land and many of these areas are home to wildlife.

Climate
Columbia has a humid continental climate (Köppen Dfa) marked by sharp seasonal contrasts in temperature, and is in USDA Plant Hardiness Zone 6a. Precipitation tends to be greatest and most frequent in the latter half of spring, when severe weather is also most common.

Cityscape

Columbia's most significant and well-known architecture is found in buildings located in its downtown area and on the university campuses. The University of Missouri's Jesse Hall and the neo-gothic Memorial Union have become icons of the city. The David R. Francis Quadrangle is an example of Thomas Jefferson's academic village concept.

Four historic districts located within the city are listed on the National Register of Historic Places: Downtown Columbia, the East Campus Neighborhood, Francis Quadrangle, and the North Ninth Street Historic District. The downtown skyline is relatively low and is dominated by the 10-story Tiger Hotel and the 15-story Paquin Tower.

Downtown Columbia is an area of approximately one square mile surrounded by the University of Missouri on the south, Stephens College to the east, and Columbia College on the north. The area serves as Columbia's financial and business district.

Since the early-21st century, a large number of high-rise apartment complexes have been built in downtown Columbia. Many of these buildings also offer mixed-use business and retail space on the lower levels. These developments have not been without criticism, with some expressing concern the buildings hurt the historic feel of the area, or that the city does not yet have the infrastructure to support them.

The city's historic residential core lies in a ring around downtown, extending especially to the west along Broadway, and south into the East Campus Neighborhood. The city government recognizes 63 neighborhood associations. The city's most dense commercial areas are primarily along Interstate 70, U.S. Route 63, Stadium Boulevard, Grindstone Parkway, and Downtown.

Demographics

2010 census
As of the census of 2010, 108,500 people, 43,065 households, and 21,418 families resided in the city. The racial makeup of the city was 79.0% White, 11.3% African American, 0.3% Native American, 5.2% Asian, 0.1% Pacific Islander, 1.1% from other races, and 3.1% from two or more races. Hispanic or Latino of any race were 3.4% of the population.

There were 43,065 households, of which 26.1% had children under the age of 18 living with them, 35.6% were married couples living together, 10.6% had a female householder with no husband present, 3.5% had a male householder with no wife present, and 50.3% were non-families. 32.0% of all households were made up of individuals, and 6.6% had someone living alone who was 65 years of age or older. The average household size was 2.32 and the average family size was 2.94.

In the city the population was spread out, with 18.8% of residents under the age of 18; 27.3% between the ages of 18 and 24; 26.7% from 25 to 44; 18.6% from 45 to 64; and 8.5% who were 65 years of age or older. The median age in the city was 26.8 years. The gender makeup of the city was 48.3% male and 51.7% female.

2000 census
As of the census of 2000, there were 84,531 people, 33,689 households, and 17,282 families residing in the city. The population density was 1,592.8 people per square mile (615.0/km). There were 35,916 housing units at an average density of 676.8 per square mile (261.3/km). The racial makeup of the city was 81.54% White, 10.85% Black or African American, 0.39% Native American, 4.30% Asian, 0.04% Pacific Islander, 0.81% from other races, and 2.07% from two or more races.  Hispanic or Latino of any race were 2.05% of the population.

There were 33,689 households, out of which 26.1% had children under the age of 18 living with them, 38.2% were married couples living together, 10.3% had a female householder with no husband present, and 48.7% were non-families. 33.1% of all households were made up of individuals, and 6.5% had someone living alone who was 65 years of age or older. The average household size was 2.26 and the average family size was 2.92.

In the city, the population was spread out, with 19.7% under the age of 18, 26.7% from 18 to 24, 28.7% from 25 to 44, 16.2% from 45 to 64, and 8.6% who were 65 years of age or older. The median age was 27 years. For every 100 females, there were 91.8 males. For every 100 females age 18 and over, there were 89.1 males.

The median income for a household in the city was $33,729, and the median income for a family was $52,288. Males had a median income of $34,710 versus $26,694 for females. The per capita income for the city was $19,507. About 9.4% of families and 19.2% of the population were below the poverty line, including 14.8% of those under age 18 and 5.2% of those age 65 or over. However, traditional statistics of income and poverty can be misleading when applied to cities with high student populations, such as Columbia.

Economy
Columbia's economy is historically dominated by education, healthcare, and insurance. Jobs in government are also common, either in Columbia or a half-hour south in Jefferson City. The Columbia Regional Airport and the Missouri River Port of Rocheport connect the region with trade and transportation.

With a Gross Metropolitan Product of $9.6 billion in 2018, Columbia's economy makes up 3% of the Gross State Product of Missouri. Columbia's metro area economy is slightly larger than the economy of Rwanda. Insurance corporations headquartered in Columbia include Shelter Insurance and the Columbia Insurance Group. Other organizations include StorageMart, Veterans United Home Loans, MFA Incorporated, the Missouri State High School Activities Association, and MFA Oil. Companies such as Socket, Datastorm Technologies, Inc. (no longer existent), Slackers CDs and Games, Carfax, and MBS Textbook Exchange were all founded in Columbia.

Top employers
According to Columbia's 2018 Comprehensive Annual Financial Report, the top employers in the city are:

Culture

The Missouri Theatre Center for the Arts and Jesse Auditorium are Columbia's largest fine arts venues. Ragtag Cinema annually hosts the True/False Film Festival.

In 2008, filmmaker Todd Sklar completed the film Box Elder, which was filmed entirely in and around Columbia and the University of Missouri.

The North Village Arts District, located on the north side of downtown, is home to galleries, restaurants, theaters, bars, music venues, and the Missouri Contemporary Ballet.

The University of Missouri's Museum of Art and Archaeology displays 14,000 works of art and archaeological objects in five galleries for no charge to the public. Libraries include the Columbia Public Library, the University of Missouri Libraries, with over three million volumes in Ellis Library, and the State Historical Society of Missouri.

Music
The "We Always Swing" Jazz Series and the Roots N Blues Festival is held in Columbia. "9th Street Summerfest" (now hosted in Rose Park at Rose Music Hall) closes part of that street several nights each summer to hold outdoor performances and has featured Willie Nelson (2009), Snoop Dogg (2010), The Flaming Lips (2010), Weird Al Yankovic (2013), and others. The "University Concert Series" regularly includes musicians and dancers from various genres, typically in Jesse Hall. Other musical venues in town include the Missouri Theatre, the university's multipurpose Hearnes Center, the university's Mizzou Arena, The Blue Note, and Rose Music Hall. Shelter Gardens, a park on the campus of Shelter Insurance headquarters, also hosts outdoor performances during the summer.

The University of Missouri School of Music attracts hundreds of musicians to Columbia, student performances are held in Whitmore Recital Hall. Among many non-profit organizations for classical music are included the "Odyssey Chamber Music Series", "Missouri Symphony", "Columbia Community Band", and "Columbia Civic Orchestra". Founded in 2006, the "Plowman Chamber Music Competition" is a biennial competition held in March/April of odd-numbered years, considered to be one of the finest, top five chamber music competitions in the nation.

Theater
Columbia has multiple opportunities to watch and perform in theatrical productions. Ragtag Cinema is one of the most well known theaters in Columbia. The city is home to Stephens College, a private institution known for performing arts. Their season includes multiple plays and musicals. The University of Missouri and Columbia College also present multiple productions a year.

The city's three public high schools are also known for their productions. Rock Bridge High School performs a musical in November and two plays in the spring. Hickman High School also performs a similar season with two musical performances (one in the fall, and one in the spring) and 2 plays (one in the winter, and one at the end of their school year). The newest high school, Battle High, opened in 2013 and also is known for their productions. Battle presents a musical in the fall and a play in the spring, along with improv nights and more productions throughout the year.

The city is also home to the indoor/outdoor theatre Maplewood Barn Theatre in Nifong Park and other community theatre programs such as Columbia Entertainment Company, Talking Horse Productions, Pace Youth Theatre and TRYPS.

Sports

The University of Missouri's sports teams, the Missouri Tigers, play a significant role in the city's sports culture. Faurot Field at Memorial Stadium, which has a capacity of 71,168, hosts home football games. The Hearnes Center and Mizzou Arena are two other large sport and event venues, the latter being the home arena for Mizzou's basketball team. Taylor Stadium is host to their baseball team and was the regional host for the 2007 NCAA Baseball Championship. Columbia College has several men and women collegiate sports teams as well. In 2007, Columbia hosted the National Association of Intercollegiate Athletics Volleyball National Championship, which the Lady Cougars participated in.

Columbia also hosts the Show-Me State Games, a non-profit program of the Missouri Governor's Council on Physical Fitness and Health. They are the largest state games in the United States.

Situated midway between St. Louis and Kansas City, Columbians will often have allegiances to the professional sports teams housed there, such as the St. Louis Cardinals, the Kansas City Royals, the Kansas City Chiefs, the St. Louis Blues, Sporting Kansas City, and St. Louis City SC.

Cuisine
Columbia has many bars and restaurants that provide diverse styles of cuisine, due in part to having three colleges. One such establishment is the historic Booches bar, restaurant, and pool hall, which was established in 1884 and is frequented by college students. Shakespeare's Pizza is known across the nation for its college town pizza.

Parks and recreation 

Throughout the city are many parks and trails for public usage. Among the more popularly frequented is the MKT which is a spur that connects to the Katy Trail, meeting up just south of Columbia proper.  The MKT ranked second in the nation for "Best Urban Trail" in the 2015 USA Todays 10 Best Readers' Choice Awards. This 10-foot wide trail built on the old railbed of the MKT railroad begins in downtown Columbia in Flat Branch Park at 4th and Cherry Streets. The all-weather crushed limestone surface provides opportunities for walking, jogging, running, and bicycling. Stephens Lake Park is the highlight of Columbia's park system and is known for its 11-acre fishing/swimming lake, mature trees, and historical significance in the community. It serves as the center for outdoor winter sports, a variety of community festivals such as the Roots N Blues Festival, and outdoor concert series at the amphitheater. Stephens Lake has reservable shelters, playgrounds, swimming beach and spraygrounds, art sculptures, waterfalls, and walking trails. Rock Bridge State Park is open year-round giving visitors the chance to scramble, hike, and bicycle through a scenic environment. Rock Bridge State Park contains some of the most popular hiking trails in the state, including the Gans Creek Wild Area. Columbia is home to Harmony Bends Disc Golf Course (https://www.como.gov/contacts/harmony-bends-championship-disc-golf-course-strawn-park/), which was named the 2017 Disc Golf Course of the Year by DGCourseReview.com. As of June, 2022, Harmony Bends still continues to rank on DGCourseReview.com as the No. 1 public course, and #2 overall course in the United States

Media

The city has two daily morning newspapers: the Columbia Missourian and the Columbia Daily Tribune. The Missourian is directed by professional editors and staffed by Missouri School of Journalism students who do reporting, design, copy editing, information graphics, photography, and multimedia. The Missourian publishes the weekly city magazine, Vox. With a daily circulation of nearly 20,000, the Daily Tribune is the most widely read newspaper in central Missouri. The University of Missouri has the independent official bi-weekly student newspaper called The Maneater, and the quarterly literary magazine, The Missouri Review. The now-defunct Prysms Weekly was also published in Columbia. In late 2009, KCOU News launched full operations out of KCOU 88.1 FM on the MU Campus. The entirely student-run news organization airs a weekday newscast, The Pulse.

The city has 4 television channels. Columbia Access Television (CAT or CAT-TV) is the public access channel. CPSTV is the education access channel, managed by Columbia Public Schools as a function of the Columbia Public Schools Community Relations Department. The Government Access channel broadcasts City Council, Planning and Zoning Commission, and Board of Adjustment meetings.

Television

Radio 
Columbia has 19 radio stations as well as stations licensed from Jefferson City, Macon and, Lake of the Ozarks.

AM
KFAL 900 kHz • Country
KWOS 950 kHz • News/Talk
KFRU 1400 kHz • News/Talk
KTGR 1580 kHz • Sports (ESPN Radio)

FM

KCOU 88.1 MHz • College
KOPN 89.5 MHz • Public
KMUC 90.5 MHz • Classical
KBIA 91.3 MHz • News (NPR)
KMFC 92.1 MHz • Christian (K-Love)
KWJK 93.1 MHz • Variety (JACK FM)
KSSZ 93.9 MHz • News/Talk
KWWR 95.7 MHz • Country
KCMQ 96.7 MHz • Classic Rock
KDVC 98.3 MHz • Classic Hits
KCLR 99.3 MHz • Country
KPLA 101.5 MHz • Variety
KBXR 102.3 MHz • Alternative
KZZT 105.5 MHz • Classic Rock
KOQL 106.1 MHz • Top 40
KTXY 106.9 MHz   Top 40

Government and politics

Columbia's current government was established by a home rule charter adopted by voters on November 11, 1974, which established a council-manager government that invested power in the city council. The city council has seven members: six elected by each of Columbia's six single-member districts or wards and an at-large member, the mayor, who is elected by all city voters. The mayor receives a $9,000 annual stipend, and the six other members receive a $6,000 annual stipend. They are elected to staggered three-year terms. As well as serving as a voting member of the city council, the mayor is recognized as the head of city government for ceremonial purposes. Chief executive authority is invested in a hired city manager, who oversees the government's day-to-day operations.

Columbia is the county seat of Boone County, and houses the county court and government center. The city is in Missouri's 4th congressional district. The 19th Missouri State Senate district covers all of Boone County. There are five Missouri House of Representatives districts (9, 21, 23, 24, and 25) in the city. The Columbia Police Department provides law enforcement across the city, while the Columbia Fire Department provides fire protection. The University of Missouri Police Department also patrols areas on and around the University of Missouri campus and has jurisdiction throughout the state. Additionally, the Boone County Sheriff's Department, the law enforcement agency for the county, regularly patrols the city. The Public Service Joint Communications Center coordinates efforts between the two organizations as well as the Boone County Fire Protection District, which operates Urban Search and Rescue Missouri Task Force 1.

The population generally supports progressive causes, such as recycling programs and the decriminalization of cannabis both for medical and recreational use at the municipal level, though the scope of the latter of the two cannabis ordinances has since been restricted. The city is one of only four in the state to offer medical benefits to same-sex partners of city employees. The new health plan extends health benefits to unmarried heterosexual domestic partners of city employees.

On October 10, 2006, the city council approved an ordinance to prohibit smoking in public places, including restaurants and bars. The ordinance was passed over protest, and several amendments to the ordinance reflect this. Over half of residents possess at least a bachelor's degree, while over a quarter hold a graduate degree. Columbia is the 13th most-highly educated municipality in the United States.

Education
Columbia and much of the surrounding area lies within the Columbia Public School District. The district enrolled more than 18,000 students and had a budget of $281 million for the 2019–20 school year. It is above the state average in both attendance percentage and graduation rate. The city operates four public high schools which cover grades 9–12: David H. Hickman High School, Rock Bridge High School, Muriel Battle High School, and Frederick Douglass High School. Rock Bridge is one of two Missouri high schools to receive a silver medal by U.S. News & World Report, putting it in the Top 3% of all high schools in the nation. Hickman has been on Newsweek magazine's list of Top 1,300 schools in the country for the past three years and has more named presidential scholars than any other public high school in the US. There are also several private high schools located in the city, including Christian Fellowship School, Columbia Independent School, Heritage Academy, Christian Chapel Academy, and Tolton High School.

CPS also manages seven middle schools: Jefferson, West, Oakland, Gentry, Smithton, Lange, and John Warner. John Warner Middle School first opened for the 2020/21 school year..

The city has three institutions of higher education: the University of Missouri, Stephens College, and Columbia College, all of which surround Downtown Columbia. The city is the headquarters of the University of Missouri System, which operates campuses in St. Louis, Kansas City, and Rolla. Moberly Area Community College, Central Methodist University, and William Woods University as well as operates satellite campuses in Columbia.

Infrastructure

Transportation
The Columbia Transit provides public bus and para-transit service, and is owned and operated by the city. In 2008, 1,414,400 passengers boarded along the system's six fixed routes and nine University of Missouri shuttle routes, and 27,000 boarded the Para-transit service. The system is constantly experiencing growth in service and technology. A $3.5 million project to renovate and expand the Wabash Station, a rail depot built in 1910 and converted into the city's transit center in the mid-1980s, was completed in summer of 2007. In 2007, a Transit Master Plan was created to address the future transit needs of the city and county with a comprehensive plan to add infrastructure in three key phases. The five to 15-year plan intends to add service along the southwest, southeast and northeast sections of Columbia and develop alternative transportation models for Boone County.

The city is served by Columbia Regional Airport. The closest rail station is Jefferson City station, in the state capital Jefferson City.

Columbia is also known for its MKT Trail, a spur of the Katy Trail State Park, which allows foot and bike traffic across the city, and, conceivably, the state. It consists of a soft gravel surface for running and biking. Columbia also is preparing to embark on construction of several new bike paths and street bike lanes thanks to a $25 million grant from the federal government. The city is also served by American Airlines and United Airlines at the Columbia Regional Airport, the only commercial airport in mid-Missouri.

I-70 (concurrent with US 40) and US 63 are the two main freeways used for travel to and from Columbia. Within the city, there are also three state highways: Routes 763 (Rangeline Street & College Avenue), 163 (Providence Road), and 740 (Stadium Boulevard).

Rail service is provided by the city-owned Columbia Terminal Railroad (COLT), which runs from the north side of Columbia to Centralia and a connection to the Norfolk Southern Railway. Columbia would be at the center of the proposed Missouri Hyperloop, reducing travel times to Kansas City and St. Louis to around 15 minutes.

Health systems

Health care is a big part of Columbia's economy, with nearly one in six people working in a health-care related profession and a physician density that is about three times the United States average. The city's hospitals and supporting facilities are a large referral center for the state, and medical related trips to the city are common. There are three hospital systems within the city and five hospitals with a total of 1,105 beds.

The University of Missouri Health Care operates three hospitals in Columbia: the University of Missouri Hospital, the University of Missouri Women's and Children's Hospital (formerly Columbia Regional Hospital), and the Ellis Fischel Cancer Center. Boone Hospital Center is administered by BJC Healthcare and operates several clinics as well as outpatient locations. The Harry S. Truman Memorial Veterans' Hospital, adjacent to University Hospital, is administered by the United States Department of Veterans Affairs.

There are a large number of medical-related industries in Columbia. The University of Missouri School of Medicine uses university-owned facilities as teaching hospitals. The University of Missouri Research Reactor Center is the largest research reactor in the United States and produces radioisotopes used in nuclear medicine. The center serves as the sole supplier of the active ingredients in two U.S. Food and Drug Administration-approved radiopharmaceuticals and produces Fluorine-18 used in PET imaging with its cyclotron.

Sister cities
In accordance with the Columbia Sister Cities Program, which operates in conjunction with Sister Cities International, Columbia has been paired with five international sister cities in an attempt to foster cross-cultural understanding:

  Kutaisi, Georgia
  Hakusan, Ishikawa, Japan

  Sibiu, Romania
  Suncheon, South Jeolla, South Korea

  Laoshan, Shandong, China

See also 

 List of people from Columbia, Missouri
 History of the University of Missouri
 National Register of Historic Places listings in Boone County, Missouri
 List of tallest buildings in Columbia, Missouri
 USS Columbia (SSN-771)
 The Big Tree

Notes

References

Bibliography
Stephens, E. W. (1875) "History of Boone County." An Illustrated Historical Atlas of Boone County, Missouri. Philadelphia: Edwards Brothers

Sapp, David (2000) "Boone County Chronicles" Columbia: Boone County Historical Society
 Brownlee, Richard S. 1956 The Big Moniteau Bluff Pictographs in Boone County, MO. Missouri Archaeologist 18(4): 49-54

Viles, Jonas The University of Missouri, 1839–1939, E.W. Stephens Publishing Company

External links

 Official city government website
 Columbia Convention & Visitors Bureau
 Columbia Chamber of Commerce
 Historic maps of Columbia in the Sanborn Maps of Missouri Collection at the University of Missouri

 
Cities in Missouri
Cities in Boone County, Missouri
Populated places established in 1821
County seats in Missouri
Columbia metropolitan area (Missouri)
Busking venues
Academic enclaves
1821 establishments in Missouri